Michael Rault (born 22 January 1989) is a Canadian singer-songwriter and guitarist. He was born in Edmonton, Alberta.

Career
Rault released Living Daylight in 2015. The album received a rating of 7.3 on Pitchfork. The single "Nothing Means Nothing" was premiered by Spin magazine. In 2018, he released It's A New Day Tonight on Wick Records, the indie rock subsidiary of Daptone Records. Rault has shared stages with Charles Bradley, Whitney, and Dent May.

Discography
 Living Daylight (2015)
 It's a New Day Tonight (2018)
 Michael Rault (2022)

References

External links
 

1989 births
Living people
Canadian male singer-songwriters
Canadian singer-songwriters
Canadian male guitarists
Musicians from Edmonton